Pentre-rhew is a hamlet in the  community of Llanddewibrefi, Ceredigion, Wales, which is 58.3 miles (93.9 km) from Cardiff and 169.6 miles (272.9 km) from London. Pentre-rhew is represented in the Senedd by Elin Jones (Plaid Cymru) and is part of the Ceredigion constituency in the House of Commons.

Etymology
The name derives from the Welsh language: "the ice village".

References

See also
List of localities in Wales by population

Villages in Ceredigion